Trincomalee Bay, also known as  Koddiyar Bay, is a bay in the Eastern Province, Sri Lanka.
The bay is located by Trincomalee town on the north-east coast of the island.

Geography 

Trincomalee Bay is open towards the northeast and has three differentiated parts. The main bay, also known as Koddiyar Bay, is located in the south and southeastern side and fairly regularly shaped, as well as enclosed and deep, forming a large natural harbour in the shores of the Indian Ocean.

The bay is overlooked by terraced hills in the northwest and its entrance is guarded by two headlands.

The bay includes a few islands: Round Island, Elephant Island and Clappenburg Island in the main bay, and Great Sober Island and Little Sober Island in China Bay. The latter two are wildlife sanctuaries

History 
Trincomalee Harbour, formerly a naval base of the Royal Navy, was taken over by the Sri Lankan Government in 1956 to be developed as a commercial port. The base in Trincomalee was fitted out to perform slipway repairs for the Sri Lanka Navy.

See also 
 Kinniya Bridge
 List of islands of Sri Lanka
 Round Island Light, Sri Lanka

References

External links 
 

Bays of the Indian Ocean
Bodies of water of Sri Lanka
Geography of Eastern Province, Sri Lanka
Bodies of water of Trincomalee District